Elections in May 2005 to elect all 62 councillors to run Warwickshire County Council for the next four years resulted, party politically, in no overall control and as such, a continuation of this status, which was first reached in 1993.  In these elections the largest single party switched to the Conservatives however the administration from 2005 was led by the  Labour Party with ongoing general support of Liberal Democrat party votes.

Summary

|}

Results arranged by district
The county is divided into 59 divisions i.e. wards which can be grouped into five districts with between 8 and 15 wards.

North Warwickshire

Nuneaton and Bedworth

Rugby

Stratford upon Avon

Warwick

 Wards marked with a star elect two members

References

2005
2005 English local elections
2000s in Warwickshire